Mike McCready (born August 8, 1960) is a former member of the Michigan House of Representatives whose district covers Birmingham, Michigan, Bloomfield Hills, Michigan, Bloomfield Township Michigan and part of West Bloomfield Township.

McCready graduated from Seaholm High School, which is in the district boundaries. He has a bachelor's degree from Western Michigan University. Before being elected to the state house in 2012 he was a member of the Bloomfield Hills City Commission.

Sources
State house bio of McCready

References

1960 births
Living people
Mayors of places in Michigan
Republican Party members of the Michigan House of Representatives
21st-century American politicians